The New Design University St. Pölten is a private university in St. Pölten, Austria. It focuses primarily on interior design and graphic design studies.

Alumni
 Matthias Laurenz Gräff (born 1984), artist

Universities and colleges in Austria
Private universities and colleges in Austria
Sankt Pölten